Cleiton de Oliveira Velasques (born 9 December 1986), commonly known as Cleiton, is a Brazilian professional footballer who currently plays as a midfielder for Hong Kong Premier League club Kitchee.

Club career
On 15 July 2018, it was announced that Cleiton had joined Hong Kong Premier League club Yuen Long.

On 3 July 2019, Cleiton joined another HKPL club Kitchee.

Honours
Caxias
 Campeonato Gaúcho Série A2: 2016

Kitchee
 Hong Kong Premier League: 2019–20
 Hong Kong Sapling Cup: 2019–20

References

External links
 
 HKFA

1986 births
Living people
Brazilian footballers
Brazilian expatriate footballers
Association football midfielders
Grêmio Esportivo Brasil players
Sociedade Esportiva e Recreativa Caxias do Sul players
Barra Futebol Clube players
Sport Club São Paulo players
Clube Esportivo Bento Gonçalves players
Esporte Clube São Luiz players
Clube Esportivo Aimoré players
Concórdia Atlético Clube players
Yuen Long FC players
Kitchee SC players
Campeonato Brasileiro Série C players
Campeonato Brasileiro Série D players
Hong Kong Premier League players
Brazilian expatriate sportspeople in Hong Kong
Expatriate footballers in Hong Kong